Off Limits may refer to:

Off Limits (1953 film), a comedy film starring Bob Hope and Mickey Rooney
Off Limits (1988 film), a mystery/thriller film starring Willem Dafoe and Gregory Hines
Off Limits (TV series), a 2011 TV series on the Travel Channel starring Don Wildman
Off Limits (album), a 1971 album by the Kenny Clarke-Francy Boland Big Band
Off Limits (anthology), a 1997 collection of science fiction stories
Off Limits, an Italian music production company run by Larry Pignagnoli